Faiz El-Ghusein (1883–1968) was a sheikh from the Hauran, and a former official of the Turkish Government.
He is most widely remembered as the author of Martyred Armenia, an alleged eyewitness account of Armenian genocide.

Early life
El-Ghusein was the son of one of the heads of the tribe of El-Sulût who lived in the Haurân territory. He attended the Mekteb-i Aşiret-i Humayun (Tribal School) at Constantinople, and continued on to the Royal College. After being attached to the staff of the Vali of Syria, he held the position of Kaimakâm of Mamouret-el-Azîz for three and a half years. He practised law at Damascus with partners Shukri Bey El-Asli and Abdul-Wahhâb Bey El-Inglîzi, and went to be a member of the General Assembly representing Haurân, and subsequently became a member of the Committee of the General Assembly.

Exodus 

Due to being accused of being involved in a plan to obtain independence for the Arab people under the protection of Britain and France, and of inciting the tribes against the Turkish Government, El-Ghusein was arrested by the Government, thrown into prison, and later taken to Aalîya to be tried for political offences. He was acquitted, but the Government disregarded the decisions and escorted him to Erzurum, however he was detained at Diarbekir by its Vali due to the Russian presence preventing them from reaching Erzurum.

Initially he was imprisoned at Diarbekir for twenty-two days, after which he remained at Diarbekir for six and a half months, witnessing and hearing of the atrocities committed by the Turks against the Armenian people. El-Ghusein then fled as described in Seven Pillars of Wisdom, written by the British soldier T. E. Lawrence:

Martyred Armenia 

Faiz El-Ghusein was exiled to Diyarbakir under the suspicion of supporting the Arab Revolt. While in Diyarbakir, El-Ghusein witnessed the massacres of Armenians in and around the area. El-Ghusein wrote much of what he witnessed in his book Martyred Armenia which provides an eyewitness account of the massacres and exposes its systematic nature. The account was originally published in Arabic in 1916 under the title "Massacres in Armenia" but was changed to Martyred Armenia under its English translation. In the foreword of the book, El-Ghusein states, "The war must needs come to an end after a while, and it will then be plain to readers of this book that all I have written is the truth, and that it contains only a small part of the atrocities committed by the Turks against the hapless Armenian people."

He wrote of the massacres and their opposition to Islamic principles as follows:

The mistreatment of the Armenians in the name of Islam distressed him greatly, and he expressed concern about how his faith was being used to justify the brutality:

He is buried in El Sharaeh, a village in Ottoman Syria.

See also

Witnesses and testimonies of the Armenian genocide

References

External links 

 Historical quotations, inhomage.com (photo)
 
 

1883 births
1968 deaths
Arabs from the Ottoman Empire
20th-century Syrian writers
Witnesses of the Armenian genocide
Politicians of the Ottoman Empire